The List of Saudi ambassadors to Yemen lists the ambassadors from Saudi Arabia to Yemen. Nine  ambassadors served between 1958 and 2019. Mohammed Al-Jaber is the most recent ambassador. He resides in Aden, Yemen's capital.

List of representatives

List of representatives to Yemen Arab Republic
The Yemen Arab Republic, also known as North Yemen or Yemen (Sana'a), was an independent country from 1962 to 1990 in the western part of what is now Yemen. Saudi Arabia aided royalist partisans of the Mutawakkilite Kingdom against supporters of the Yemen Arab Republic until 1970, when Faisal of Saudi Arabia recognized the republic. Thereafter, the Saudi government maintained diplomatic relations. The Yemen Arab Republic united with the People's Democratic Republic of Yemen (commonly known as South Yemen), on May 22, 1990, to form the current Republic of Yemen.

References

 
Yemen
Saudi Arabia